This is a list of the card sets for the Legend of the Five Rings collectible card game ("L5R") published by AEG. L5R is marketed through base sets and expansion sets. Base sets are typically composed primarily of reprinted cards from prior sets with a smaller number of new cards. Expansion sets (which are smaller than base sets) are composed entirely of new cards. Cards are sold in 60-90 card semi-randomized starter decks and booster packs which have a smaller number (typically 11 or 15) of random cards. Starters feature a particular faction, including new fixed rarity cards and a Stronghold card for that faction. They also include cards from previous sets and are intended to be fully playable decks.

In addition to starters and boosters, there is also the occasional "learn to play" set containing two fixed decks and an expanded rulebook for new players and a fixed "direct to player" set unavailable except directly from AEG.

For the purpose of tournament format/legality and the storyline, L5R's sets are divided into "arcs". From the beginning of the game's second arc with Jade Edition, cards have featured a "bug" (a kanji approximation of the edition's name) in a lower corner of the card's text box showing that card's legality. The only cards legal at most official tournaments are those printed with the current bug (or earlier printings of those cards). These bugs are shown next to each arc's title.

Originally, sets were differentiated by the color of their borders. From Gold Edition on, cards have an expansion code, card number, and rarity symbol listed on their lower edge. The rarity symbols are circle for common, diamond for uncommon, star for rare, triangle for promo, hollow diamond for "premium" (bonus cards found in Emperor Edition and later boosters), and star within a circle for fixed cards.

Clan Wars

Hidden Emperor - "Jade" 

With Jade Edition, L5R introduced the concept of "arc legality". Newly printed cards were now marked with a "Jade bug". This allowed tournament rules to limit the card base allowed to be used: either "Strict Jade" in which only cards with the bug were legal or "Extended Jade" in which all Actions, Followers, Items, Kihos, and Regions were legal but all other types were required to have the bug.

Four Winds - "Gold" 

With the new Gold Edition, AEG reduced the number of factions in the game from 14 to 8 by removing the Brotherhood, Naga, Ninja, Spirit, Toturi's Army, and Yoritomo's Alliance factions. The Mantis and Ratling factions were then introduced in expansions later in the block, bringing the total to 10. All sets in this arc included random foil versions of rare cards.

Rain of Blood - "Diamond"

Age of Enlightenment - "Lotus"

Race for the Throne - "Samurai" 
The Ratling faction was removed, and the Shadowlands faction became the Spider Clan, although not all Shadowlands cards transitioned. This brought the total faction count to 9, establishing the factions that have been in play since.

The Destroyer War - "Celestial"

Age of Conquest - "Emperor" 30px

A Brother's Destiny - "Ivory" 30px

Other

References

Legend of the Five Rings